Software art is a work of art where the creation of software, or concepts from software, play an important role; for example software applications which were created by artists and which were intended as artworks. As an artistic discipline software art has attained growing attention since the late 1990s. It is closely related to Internet art since it often relies on the Internet, most notably the World Wide Web, for dissemination and critical discussion of the works. Art festivals such as FILE Electronic Language International Festival (São Paulo), Transmediale (Berlin), Prix Ars Electronica (Linz) and readme (Moscow, Helsinki, Aarhus, and Dortmund) have devoted considerable attention to the medium and through this have helped to bring software art to a wider audience of theorists and academics.

Selection of artists and works
 Scott Draves is best known for creating the Electric Sheep in 1999, the Bomb visual-musical instrument in 1995, and the Fractal flame algorithm in 1992.
 Robert B. Lisek, creator of NE5T – Citizens Intelligent Agency and GGGRU worm, datamining software for searching hidden patterns and links between people, groups, objects, events, places /based on LANL's and GRU's antiterrorist software
 Bob Holmes is an artist who creates websites that are signed, exhibited and sold in galleries and Museums as autonomous artworks.
 Netochka Nezvanova is the author of nebula.m81, an experimental web browser awarded at Transmediale 2001 in the category "artistic software". She is also the creator of the highly influential nato.0+55+3d software suite for live video manipulation.
 Jason Salavon is known for the creation of "amalgamations" that average dozens of images to create individual, ethereal "archetype" images.
 Alexei Shulgin is well known for this 386DX performance group, but is also credited with early software art-inspired creations.
 Adrian Ward has won several awards for his Signwave Auto-Illustrator, a generative art graphic design application, which parodies Adobe Photoshop.
 Martin Wattenberg is one of the pioneers of data visualization art, creating works based on music, photographs, and even Wikipedia edits.
 Corby & Baily were early experimenters in this field, producers of the reconnoitre web browser which won an honorary mention in the net art section of Ars Electronica in 1999.
 LIA is one of the early pioneers of Software and Net Art. Her website, re-move.org (1999–2003) received an Award of Distinction in the Net Vision/Net Excellence Category of Ars Electronica in 2003.

See also
Art game, a specialized form of playable software art
Demoscene
Internet art, a related form of art
Digital art
Computer art, a related form of art

Further reading
DATA browser 02 (2005). Engineering Culture: On 'The Author as (Digital) Producer'. Autonomedia / Arts Council England. 
Barreto, Ricardo and Perissinotto,  Paula “the_culture_of_immanence”, in Internet Art. Ricardo Barreto e Paula Perissinotto (orgs.). São Paulo, IMESP, 2002. .
Luining, Peter (2004). Read_Me 2004. An extensive review of the Run_Me software art conference/ festival held in Aarhus, Denmark 2004.
Bosma, Josephine (2004). Constructing Media Spaces
Broeckmann, Andreas (2006). Software Art Aesthetics|
Broeckmann, Andreas (2004). Runtime Art: Software, Art, Aesthetics
Corby, Tom (2006). "Network Art: Practices and Positions". Routledge, .
Duarte, German A.; Fractal Narrative. About the Relationship Between Geometries and Technology and Its Impact on Narrative Spaces. Bielefeld: Transcript, 2014.  
Thomas Dreher (2005) Konzeptuelle Kunst und Software Art: Notationen, Algorithmen und Codes (Conceptual Art and Software Art, In German)
Oliver Grau: Virtual Art: From Illusion to Immersion, MIT-Press/Leonardo Book Series, Cambridge 2003.
Magnusson, Thor (2002).  Processor Art: Currents in the Process Oriented Works of Generative and Software Art
Christine Buci-Glucksmann, "L'art à l'époque virtuel", in Frontières esthétiques de l'art, Arts 8, Paris: L'Harmattan, 2004
Paul, Christiane (2003). Digital Art (World of Art series). London: Thames & Hudson. .
Edward A. Shanken. (1998). "The House that Jack Built – Jack Burnham's Concept of 'Software' as a Metaphor for Art" Leonardo Electronic Almanac 6:10.
Edward A. Shanken (2002). "Art in the Information Age: Technology and Conceptual Art" Leonardo (Leonardo/ISAT) 35:4: 433–38.
Software Art Andreas Broegger Copenhagen
Mitchell Whitelaw.  Metacreation:  art and artificial life.  Cambridge, MA:  MIT Press, 2004
Savli, Ahmet (2019). "As a new tool of art digital coding and software art"
 Albert, Saul (1999). Artware

Computer art
Digital art